Grimmtastic Girls is a series of eight children's books written by Joan Holub and Suzanne Williams and published between 2014 and 2016 with Scholastic Inc. The themes and characters of the stories stem from  Grimm's Fairytales (and other nursery rhymes and fairy tales). Each story is told from the perspective of a different fairytale character including Cinderella, Little Red Riding Hood, Rapunzel, Snow White, Sleeping Beauty, and Goldilocks. The series is set at the boarding school Grimm Academy in the country of Grimmlandia where these brave girls deal with life in middle school, are chosen by magic charms, and work to foil dastardly plots of the E.V.I.L. Society.

Female characters

Cinderella
Cinderella, nicknamed Cinda, is the new girl at boarding school. After Cinda's mother died, her dad remarried to her stepmother, who had two spoiled children, Malorette and Odette, nicknamed the Steps. The Steps wreak havoc on Cinda's life as they manipulate, trick, blackmail, and attempt to frame Cinda for their evil plots. In the first book, Cinderella Stays Late, she starts her first day at Grimm Academy and meets her new BFFs: Red, Rapunzel, and Snow. She also meets the new heartthrob, Prince Awesome, who eventually wins Cinda's affections in Cinderella's story. Cinda's hurt and fear of the Steps leaves her too scared to report suspicious behavior, and it is not until she overhears a dark plot involving the E.V.I.L. Society, that she takes action.

Rapunzel
Rapunzel is a goth girl who is fearless—well, except for her extreme fear of heights (acrophobia). Because of her acrophobia, she received special permission to live in the dungeon of Pink Tower instead of the dorms at the top. Rapunzel has extremely long hair that grows continuously, and very quickly despite her efforts to cut it, evidently because of a spell a witch cast on her. Her magical charm is an onyx carved comb that grows on her command. In the book Rapunzel Cuts Loose, she has a crush on Prince Perfect, until she finds out he only likes her because of her long, luxurious, and silky locks. She develops a love for Basil, a boy she met in the first grade and saved from a bully, making him the love interest in her story. She foils plans of the E.V.I.L. Society, seals the witch that raised her, and finds the magical treasure that is said to save the school.

Red Riding Hood
Red Riding Hood, nicknamed Red, is a girl who loves to act, but suffers from stage fright. Red is described as a girl with glitter-red-streaked, curly black hair, hooded by a red cape. To her friends' delight, she is a talented baker and the task of Snack-Maker magically chooses her. The second book, Red Riding Hood Gets Lost, is written from her perspective and introduces readers to her roommate Gretel (the heroine of the final book in the series). Red's magical charm is a brown wicker basket that can manifest anything that fits inside it, at her command. She has a horrible sense of direction, which sometimes makes her late for classes or meals. Wolfgang helps Red overcome her stage fright and the two develop a love interest in one another.

Snow White
Snow White, nicknamed Snow, is a shy and unlucky girl who enjoys keeping tidy and helps Cinda tidy her hearth in the first book, Cinderella Stays Late. Snow is described as a girl with pale skin, short ebony hair, and emerald green eyes. When Snow was less than a year old, her mother died and her father married her stepmother, Ms. Wicked. When Snow was six, her father died, leaving Snow with her mean stepmom who does not like her. Booted out of the castle by a distant heir, Ms. Wicked obtains a teaching job at Grimm Academy to make a living. The third book, Snow White Lucks Out, is written from Snow's point of view. Snow is allergic to all kinds of fruit and she fully believes in lucky charms. She wears a clover charm around her neck at all times. Like her mother, Snow is good at dancing and sewing, but she would have really liked to have learned from her mother. Snow has a crush on Prince Prince, the prince of her story. Her lucky charm is a golden tiara with 7 Turquoise jewels, the middle jewel can make her invisible if she presses it, like a button.

Sleeping Beauty
Briar Rose who just goes by her middle name, Rose, is a daredevil. According to her fairy tale, after her twelfth birthday, Rose must avoid all sharp objects. That is difficult at Grimm Academy, where enchanted items can also be dangerous. Rose will have to stay wide awake to keep out of trouble.

Goldilocks
Goldilocks is a new girl and so eager to make friends at Grimm Academy, she is tempted to accept an invitation to join E.V.I.L. just to be included. Goldie ends up working as a double agent with Grimm Organization of Defense (G.O.O.D.) to help foil plans of the E.V.I.L. Society. She ultimately finds herself trying a break-in attempt past the three curfew guards: bears.

Snowflake
Snowflake is the heroine of the 7th book, Snowfalke Freezes Up, in which she is uncertain which fairy tale character she is and spends time searching her truth in books in the library. Just in case she might be a villain, Snowflake is chilly to her classmates to avoid hurting anyone. Her magic charm is a snowflake and her powers begin to cause some trouble. Ultimately, she must help fight Jack Frost and distinguish if Dragonbreath is good or evil.

Gretel
Gretel enjoys hiking and working on her hiking guide. The final book, Gretel pushes back, is from her perspective. She joins the quest for justice in a world where the E.V.I.L. Society must be stopped. Along the way, out in the woods, she finds a candy cottage. Her story inspires readers to explore their passions and treasure the unique dynamic of sibling relationships as she relates to her brother, Hansel, with both affection and bickering.

Male characters

Prince Awesome
Prince Awesome is the prince of the Kingdom of Awesomeness, and the prince in Cinderella's story. He is described as a tall, handsome boy with wavy hair who is polite and concerned about doing what is right. He is first introduced in Cinderella Stays Late, in which Principal R introduces him along with Cinda as the two new kids and he invites everyone to his Ball. He does not appear to know about the E.V.I.L Society or what they are doing. He is on the  team and he has a crush on Cinda.

Wolfgang
Wolfgang seems to be a loner who hangs out in the Neverwood forest, where he supposedly shapeshifts into a wolf. He is described as a boy with brown hair and grey eyes, usually sporting a wolf-skin cloak. He is first shown in Cinderella Stays Late, but has more of a major role in Red Riding Hood Gets Lost in which he has a crush on Red. Like Red, he enjoys acting and even played the second lead role in the school play Peter and the Wolf and the male lead in Red Robin Hood. When Wolfgang decides he wants to get into E.V.I.L., he spies on the members to get information, but is ultimately denied membership. Wolfgang's greatest fear is to be evil like his uncles. His great-great-grandmother is Grandmother Enchantress (whom he calls Grandtress), the sister of the Grimm brothers.

Prince Foulsmell
Prince Foulsmell, a student at Grimm Academy, has tousled brown hair, and he smells pretty much just right for a boy. In an effort to fit in with the wrong crowd, Goldilocks is initially rude to Foulsmell and insults him. Prince Foulsmell seems to have a crush on Goldilocks, and she later befriends him as he plays an important part in Goldilocks' quest to thwart the E.V.I.L society.

Principal Rumplestiltskin
Rumplestiltskin is very small in stature, covered in gold dust, and reveals an explosive temper, an obsession with alchemy, and a hatred of hearing his own name. He threatens students with scullery duty and other punishments merely for saying his name. Interestingly, he can cool off as quickly as he explodes.

Jack Frost
Jack Frost is a villain in Snowflake's story.

Dragonbreath
A character in Snowflake Freezes Up who breathes fire. Snowflake must determine if he is good or evil.

Prince Prince
A character first introduced in Snow White Lucks Out, he is shown to have an interest in Snow white.

Books in series
 Cinderella Stays Late
 Red Riding Hood Gets Lost
 Snow White Lucks Out
 Rapunzel Cuts Loose
 Sleeping Beauty Dreams Big
 Goldilocks Breaks In
 Snowflake Freezes Up
 Gretel Pushes Back

See also

References

Series of children's books
American children's books
Literature based on fairy tales
2010s children's books